Narnaund Assembly constituency is one of the 90 Vidhan Sabha constituencies of Haryana state in northern India.

Overview
It is part of Hisar Lok Sabha constituency.

Winner

2014–2019
For many years, this constituency has been seen as anti-Congress seat.

In 1967, Rameshwar Dutt won first MLA election from Narnaund assembly constituency of the newly created Haryana state. In 1968 and 1972, Joginder Singh  won two consecutive assembly elections. In 1977, 1982, 1987 and 1992, Virendra Singh won four consecutive legislative assembly elections. In 1996, 2000, 2005 and 2009 it was won by Jaswant Singh, Ram Bhagat Sharma, Ram Kumar Gautam and Saroj Mor respectively.

In 2014 Assembly Elections, cabinet minister Captain Abhimanyu of BJP won the 2014 Haryana Legislative Assembly election over Raj Singh Mor of INLD and independent candidate Ram Kumar Gautam.

See also

 Haryana Legislative Assembly
 Elections in Haryana
 Elections in India
 Lok Sabha
 Rajya Sabha
 Election Commission of India

References

External links
 Chief Election Officer, Haryana

Assembly constituencies of Haryana
Hisar district